Fish & Richardson P.C. is a global patent, intellectual property litigation, and commercial litigation law firm with more than 400 attorneys and technology specialists across the USA and Europe. Fish is one of the most sought-after firms for both patent litigation and patent prosecution services among Fortune 100 companies. Fish has been named the #1 patent litigation firm in the U.S. for 12 consecutive years.  

Founded in Boston in 1878, Fish & Richardson came to be known for its representation of prominent American inventors of the late 19th and early 20th centuries, including Alexander Graham Bell, Thomas Edison and the Wright Brothers. The firm has since grown to 14 offices in the United States, Germany, and China. 

In February 2020, the company named John Adkisson as president and CEO.

Recognition
Band 1 US Rankings for IP and ITC, Chambers Global, 2015-2021 
IP Practice Group of the Year, Law360, 2012 – 2016, 2018  2020 – 2021 
Top National Ranking – Patent Litigation, IAM Patent 1000, 2012 – 2021
Top 10 Firm, Associate Career Development, Chambers USA, 2021
IP Boutique Firm of the Year, Managing Intellectual Property, 2021 
Top Trademark Firm, World Trademark Review, 2011-2021
ITC Firm of the Year, Managing Intellectual Property, 2019-2021
Number 1 Law Firm at the PTAB, Managing Intellectual Property, 2018 – 2021
One of America’s Top Trusted Corporate Law Firms – IP, Forbes, 2019
Hall of Fame, Corporate Counsel, 2019
US Patent Litigation Firm of the Year, IAM & WTR Global IP Awards, 2019
Appellate Hot List, The National Law Journal, 2011-2019
IP Firm of the Year, National Impact Case of the Year, Benchmark Litigation, 2019

Notable alumni
 Frederick Perry Fish, Founder of the firm and president of American Telephone & Telegraph Corporation from 1901 to 1907.

References

External links
Fish & Richardson web site
Profile from LexisNexis Martindale-Hubbell
Fish Post Grant

Patent law firms
Intellectual property law firms
Biopharmaceutical law firms
Law firms established in 1878